Canan Ergüder (born 15 July 1977) is a Turkish actress.

Life and career 
Ergüder was born on 15 July 1977 in Istanbul, Turkey. Her father, Üstün Ergüder, is a professor in political sciences. Her family is of Bosnian descent. She studied theatre at Franklin & Marshall College and later graduated with a master's degree from School of Drama at The New School. She also briefly took part in a program at the London Academy of Music and Dramatic Art. In 2003, she became a permanent member of Actors Studio, which is founded by Elia Kazan, Cheryl Crawford and Robert Lewis. In 2007, she received the Best Supporting Actress Award at the Hoboken International Film Festival for her role in Shooting Johnson Roebling as Nancy.

After continuing her career on stage by taking parts in plays such as Graceland, Rattlesnake, Twelfth Night, Love's Labor's Lost, Three Sisters and Arcadia. 

She made her television debut in 2007 with hit series Bıçak Sırtı with Nejat İşler, Mehmet Günsür after which she most notably appeared in Binbir Gece. She is best known for franchise crime series and film Behzat Ç. Bir Ankara Polisiyesi with Erdal Beşikçioğlu, Nejat İşler, Fatih Artman. 

In 2009, she received the Most Successful Actress in a Supporting Role award at the Afife Jale Theatre Awards for her role in the play Bayrak. Ergüder had a supporting role in the 2011 movie Will, and similarly made appearances in Russell Crowe's The Water Diviner and Huner Saleem's Tight Dress. 

Between 2014–2016, she had a leading role in the TV series Güllerin Savaşı with Damla Sönmez. She played in Menajerimi Ara which adapted from French series alongside Fatih Artman.

On 6 April 2021, she announced on her social media accounts that she was diagnosed with breast cancer.

Filmography

Film

Television

Theatre

Awards

References

External links 
 
 

Living people
1977 births
Actresses from Istanbul
Turkish television actresses
Turkish film actresses
Turkish stage actresses
Üsküdar American Academy alumni
Turkish people of Bosniak descent
Alumni of the London Academy of Music and Dramatic Art
Franklin & Marshall College alumni
The New School alumni
Turkish expatriates in the United States